Joseph August Nikrent (August 4, 1879 in Detroit, Michigan – July 25, 1958 in Los Angeles, California) was an American racecar driver. He competed in four AAA Championship Car races from 1909 to 1913, winning the 1909 point-to-point race between Phoenix, Arizona and Los Angeles behind the wheel of a Buick. He drove in the 1913 Indianapolis 500 behind the wheel of a Case but burned a bearing on the 67th lap and failed to finish. He returned to Indy in 1915 but failed to qualify. He later made land speed record attempts.

Indy 500 results

References

Indianapolis 500 drivers
1879 births
1958 deaths
Racing drivers from Detroit